Central Ring Road  is a partly  Russian federal highway in Moscow Oblast and Moscow. 

The main purpose of the Central Ring Road is to unload federal roads and the Moscow Ring Road by redistributing the transit flow of vehicles bypassing Moscow.

Characteristics
 Length: 525 km
 Average speed: 80–140 km/h
 Number of interchanges: 34
 Number of bridges and overpasses: 278
 Number of lanes: from 4  to 8

See also
MKAD

References

External links
The official website of the project

Ring roads in Moscow
Roads in Moscow Oblast